The Hsinchu Science Park (HSP) is an industrial park established by the government of the Republic of China on 15 December 1980. It straddles Hsinchu City and Hsinchu County in Taiwan.

History
The idea of the establishment of the Hsinchu Science Park was first proposed by Shu Shien-Siu, the former President of National Tsing Hua University and Minister of Science and Technology. After Shu became the Minister of Science and Technology in 1973, he traveled to the United States, Europe, and Japan to learn and study their conditions of the development of science and technology. In 1976, Shu came up with the idea of building a science and technology park like that of Silicon Valley. President Chiang Ching-kuo proposed to build the park in Longtan District because of the potential future benefits that could be drawn from National Chung-Shan Institute of Science and Technology and the military. However, Shu argued that the technology and science park should not be close to the military as the primary goal of the founding of the park is to expand the size of private economy and creative vitality of Taiwan. Shu's idea was to build the park in Hsinchu next to the National Tsing Hua University and the (then) National Chiao Tung University like the Silicon Valley, which is adjacent to Stanford University and University of California, Berkeley. Shu's idea was ultimately approved by Chiang and the park was built and opened in 1980 in Hsinchu.

After the original idea of the establishment of the science park and the location of the park were settled, Chiang Ching-kuo assigned the task of constructing the Hsinchu Science Park.
Irving Tze Ho (1921–2003) was tasked to set up the park in 1979 and serve as its first director.
Li Kwoh-ting, former Finance Minister of the Republic of China, was among those who significantly contributed to the founding of the park, as ordered by Chiang. Inspired by Silicon Valley, Li consulted Frederick Terman on how Taiwan could follow its example. From there, Li convinced talents who had gone abroad to build companies in this new Silicon Valley in Taiwan.  Among those who returned is Morris Chang, who later led the Industrial Technology Research Institute (ITRI) and founded TSMC. Li also introduced the concept of venture capital to the country to attract funds to finance high-tech startups in Taiwan.

Overview
The park houses more than 400 high-tech companies, mainly involved in the semiconductor, computer, telecommunication, and optoelectronics industries, have been established in the park since the end of December 2003. Its 400 technology companies accounted for 10% of Taiwan's gross domestic product in 2007. It is home to the world's top two semiconductor foundries, Taiwan Semiconductor Manufacturing Company (TSMC) and United Microelectronics Corporation (UMC), both of which were established at the nearby Industrial Technology Research Institute. Taiwan is the only country that possesses a professional division-of-labor system in the semiconductor industry and also has the highest density of 12-inch wafer-producing fabs, most of which are based in the park.
Next door to the science park are two of Taiwan's science and engineering powerhouses, National Yang Ming Chiao Tung University and National Tsing Hua University, and the National Space Organization, the Taiwanese space agency, are located in the park.

There were local residents' protests against water and air pollution. The Park's industrial wastewater treatment plant began to operate in 1986 and effectively treats wastewater for maximum safety while Taiwan's National Environmental Protection Department monitors the air quality in the park and surrounding areas to maintain clean air quality.

Locations
Currently, the Hsinchu Science Park covers six locations:
 Hsinchu Science Park in East District, Hsinchu City and Baoshan, Hsinchu County
 Zhunan Science Park in Zhunan, Miaoli County
 Longtan Science Park in Longtan District, Taoyuan
 Tongluo Science Park in Tongluo Township, Miaoli County
 Yilan Science Park in Yilan City, Yilan County
 Biomedical Science Park in Zhubei, Hsinchu County

Major companies located in the park

Acer Inc.
Apple Inc.
Applied Materials
Axtronics Inc.
Alpha Networks Inc.
AU Optronics
ChipMOS TECHNOLOGIES, LTD. (IMOS)
Chimei Innolux
Cadence Design Systems
Coretronic
Epistar
Elan Microelectronics Corporation
Global Unichip Corporation
Hermes-Epitek
Holtek
Kingston Technology 
Lam Research
Lite-On
Logitech
Macronix International (MXIC)
MediaTek
Microtek
MiTAC
MStar Semiconductor
MA-tek Inc.
Novatek
Nuvoton Technology Corp.
Optodisc
Philips
Powerchip Semiconductor (PSC)
ProMOS Technologies
Qualcomm
Realtek
Silicon Integrated Systems
Shin-Etsu Chemical
SMOBIO Technology, Inc.
Sunplus
Source Photonics 
Tecom - Tecom Co., Ltd
Tokyo Electron 
TSMC - Taiwan Semiconductor Manufacturing Company Ltd.
United Microelectronics Corporation
Vanguard International Semiconductor Corporation
Wistron
Winbond
ZyXEL

See also

 Business cluster
 Economy of Taiwan
 Mega-Site
 Southern Taiwan Science Park
 National Experimental High School: A K-12 school established to provide special education opportunity to personnel of Greater Science Park Area.

References

1980 establishments in Taiwan
Buildings and structures in Hsinchu
Science parks in Taiwan